World Rally Fever: Born on the Road (also known simply as World Rally Fever) is a racing game created by Belgian developers Split alongside British developer Team17. The game was released by Team17 on May 5, 1996, and was originally published in the UK by Ocean Software. It was later re-released by Sold-Out Software. World Rally Fever featured anime style art and characters which raced cart-like vehicles through various world-themed tracks, such as Scotland, France, the United States, Japan and several other nations.

The game was re-released in 2012 on GOG.com with support for Microsoft Windows and pre-released with DOSBox.

Gameplay 

World Rally Fever is a racing game in which the player raced across the world through sixteen tracks, each divided into four tracks based on the championships cups (Rookie, Amateur, Pro-Am and Pro) the player choose which serves as difficulty level (Pro must be unlocked by completing all previous cups). The player will travel the globe, and race in Scotland, France, the United States, Japan and several other nations.  Obstacles litter the track, such as fences, sheep and hay stacks which can be  jump over. Each of the four championships cups (or difficulty) serve as how difficult the four tracks is in that particular cups, ranged from easy (dealing with less obstacles and trap hazards) to hard (encountering more hazards and hard-to-traverse roads).

Before racing, there are eight characters to choose from, each with unique characteristics that affect the handling of their vehicle (those eight are composed of four pairs, whose cars handle the same). Once you have selected a cup and characters, you must qualify in the four races and accumulate the most points to win. If you place anything below third in a race, you will fail and the only way to continue will be to use one of your credits (one credit for Rookie, two credits for Amateur, and three credits for Pro-Am and Pro). Your game ends once you run out of credits. Otherwise, you will travel to the next course when you qualify.

Player will encounter power-up while racing which will benefit them, although some track does not feature them at all. These are acquirable by driving under special icons placed above the track. There are a totals of five power-up to use, ranging from throwing a bomb to dropping a box with a dung sign. Sometime the opponent will drop a box during racing, as well as a special reverse sign in which if collide with it resulted in your controls being reverse for a short while. The special reverse sign power-up is only exclusive to opponents.

Development and release

Reception

References

External links 

 World Rally Fever at GameFAQs
 World Rally Fever at MobyGames

1996 video games
DOS games
DOS-only games
Games commercially released with DOSBox
Ocean Software games
Racing video games
Team17 games
Video games developed in Belgium
Windows games